Aurelio may refer to:

People

Politicians
Aurelio D. Gonzales Jr. (born 1964), congressman in the Philippines
Aurélio de Lira Tavares (1905–1998), President of Brazil
Aurelio Martínez, Honduran politician
Aurelio Mosquera (1883–1939), President of Ecuador
Aurelio Sousa Matute (1860–1925), Peruvian lawyer and politician

Footballers
Aurelio Andreazzoli (born 1953), Italian football coach and manager
Aurelio Domínguez, Chilean footballer
Aurelio González (footballer) (1905–1997), Paraguayan footballer
Aurelio Vidmar (born 1967), Australian footballer
Fábio Aurélio (born 1979), Brazilian footballer
José Aurelio Gay (born 1965), Spanish footballer and manager
Marcos Aurelio Di Paulo (1920–1996), Argentine footballer who played for FC Barcelona
Salvatore Aurelio (born 1986), Italian footballer

Baseball players
Aurelio López (1948–1992), Mexican professional baseball player
Aurelio Monteagudo (1943–1990), pitcher who played in Major League Baseball
Aurelio Rodríguez (1947–2000), Mexican professional baseball player

Other sports people
Aurelio Díaz (boxer) (born 1923), Spanish welterweight boxerGames
Aurelio Genghini (1907–2001), Italian long-distance runner
Aurelio González (boxer) (born 1939), Argentine boxer
Aurelio González Puente (born 1940), Spanish road racing cyclist
Aurelio Menegazzi (1900–1979), Italian racing cyclist
Marcus Aurélio (born 1973), Brazilian mixed martial arts fighter

Other people
Aurélio Buarque de Holanda Ferreira (1910–1989), Brazilian lexicographer
Aurelio Fierro (1923–2005), Italian actor and singer
Aurelio Lampredi (1917–1989), Italian automobile and aircraft engine designer
Aurelio Macedonio Espinosa Jr. (1907–2004), professor on linguistics and folklore
Aurelio Macedonio Espinosa Sr. (1880–1958), professor on folklore and philology
Aurelio Sabattani (1912–2003), Italian prelate of the Roman Catholic Church
Aurelio Martínez, Honduran musician who sings in the Garifuna language
Aurelio Voltaire, Cuban-American musician

Fictional characters
Aurelio Casillas, in the TV series El Señor de los Cielos
Aurelio Zen, a principal character in the works of Michael Dibdin
Aurelio Rosas-Sanchez, a secondary antagonist in Man on Fire (2004 film)
Aurelio, a character in John Wick

Other uses
Aurélio Dictionary, a dictionary of the Portuguese language, published in Brazil
Aurelio, San Jose, a place in the Philippines

See also
Aurelia (gens)
Aurelius (disambiguation)
Marco Aurélio, a Spanish or Portuguese given name

Spanish masculine given names
Italian masculine given names